The 2005 European Nations Cup saw France secure their first win over Wales in 24 years, winning 38–16 and taking the European Nations Cup back to France.

The revamped competition involved six teams competing in two groups of three. Five of the teams: France, Ireland, Scotland, Wales, Russia qualified automatically for the tournament, whilst new entrant Georgia came through a qualifying tournament.

Qualifying Tournament

Results

Final standings

Georgia advanced to Group 2.

Group 1

Results

Final standings

Wales advanced to the final.

Group 2

Results

Final standings

France advanced to the final.

Final

European Nations Cup
European nations cup
2005 in French rugby league
2005 in Welsh rugby league
2005 in Russian sport
2005 in Georgian sport
2005 in Irish sport
2005 in Scottish sport
2005 in Dutch sport
2005 in Serbian sport